The  is a  zoo, managed by the Tokyo Metropolitan Government, and located in Taitō, Tokyo, Japan. It is Japan's oldest zoo, opened on March 20, 1882. It is served by Ueno Station, Keisei Ueno Station and Nezu Station, with convenient access from several public transportation networks (JR East, Tokyo Metro and Keisei Electric Railway). The Ueno Zoo Monorail, the first monorail in the country, connects the eastern and western parts of the grounds.

The zoo is in Ueno Park, a large urban park that is home to museums, a small amusement park, and other attractions. The zoo is closed on Mondays (Tuesday if Monday is a holiday).

History 
The zoo started life as a menagerie attached to the National Museum of Natural History. In 1881, responsibility for this menagerie was handed to naturalist and civil servant Tanaka Yoshio, who oversaw its transition into a public zoo.

World War II 
In August 1943, the administrator of Tokyo, Shigeo Ōdachi, ordered that all "wild and dangerous animals" at the zoo be killed, claiming that bombs could hit the zoo and escaped animals would wreak havoc in the streets of Tokyo. Requests by the staff at the zoo for a reprieve, or to evacuate the animals elsewhere, were refused. The animals were executed primarily by poisoning, strangulation or by simply placing the animals on starvation diets.  A memorial service was held for the animals in September 1943 (while two of the elephants were still starving) and a permanent memorial (built anew in 1975) can be found in the Ueno Zoo.

Shortly after the March 1945 bombings of Tokyo, the Japanese placed U.S. Army Air Force navigator and bombardier Ray "Hap" Halloran on display naked in a Ueno Zoo tiger cage so civilians could walk in front of the cage and view the B-29 prisoner.

Recent renovations 
The zoo provides animals an environment similar to the natural habitat.  In recent years, some of the old-fashioned cages of the past have been replaced with modern habitats, such as the "Gorilla Woods," built after two well-publicized mishaps in 1999. Many of the animal's enclosures, such as that for the giraffe, hippopotamus, and rhinoceros are still the old style single stall concrete cages with very little room for the animals.

Animals

The zoo is home to more than 2,600 individuals representing over 500 species.

Principal animals 

After the death of giant panda Ling Ling in 2008, Ueno Zoo was without a member of this species for the first time since 1972. Two new giant pandas arrived from the Chinese Wolong Nature Reserve in February 2011. The male panda, Billy (比力 ビーリー) was renamed in Ueno to Līlī  (力力 リーリー) to emphasize his playful vitality. The female's name Siennyu (仙女 シィエンニュ ‘Fairy’) was changed to Shinshin (真真 シンシン), referring to purity (純真) and innocence (天真). The new names were based on a public poll. The final choices picked by the zoo were, however, not among top choices. Reduplication is very common in panda names.

The zoo is split into two sections, connected by a bridge called the Aesop Bridge, built in 1961 and a monorail.

The eastern garden houses giant pandas, sika deer, Japanese squirrels, Eurasian otters, green pheasants, snowy owls, Asian elephants, American bison, black-tailed prairie dogs, colobus monkeys, black-handed spider monkeys, Japanese macaques, African sacred ibises, Japanese black bears, sun bears, Ussuri brown bears, red-crowned cranes, South American tapirs, Sumatran tigers, western lowland gorillas, polar bears, California sea lions and harbor seals.

The western garden houses red pandas, western grey kangaroos, African penguins, Caribbean flamingos, shoebills, Barbary sheep, hippopotamus, pygmy hippopotamus, black rhinoceros, reticulated giraffes, okapis, Aldabra giant tortoises, saltwater crocodiles, green iguanas, Japanese pond turtles, aye-ayes, ring-tailed lemurs, black-and-white ruffed lemurs, gray gentle lemurs, cackling geese, great white pelicans, Oriental storks and Steller's sea eagles.

See also
Faithful Elephants, story of the elephants in the zoo during World War II
 Tama Zoological Park
 Tokyo Sea Life Park

References

Further reading
Itoh, Mayumi (2010). Japanese Wartime Zoo Policy: The Silent Victims of World War II. Palgrave-MacMillan. .
Miller, Ian Jared (2013). The Nature of the Beasts: Empire and Exhibition at the Tokyo Imperial Zoo. University of California Press.

External links

 

Ueno Park
Tourist attractions in Tokyo
Zoos in Japan
1882 establishments in Japan
Zoos established in 1882